At least four ships of the French Navy have been named Turquoise:

 , an  launched in 1908 and captured by the Ottoman Empire in 1915.
 , a  launched in 1929 and scuttled in 1943.

French Navy ship names